Condylarthra is an informal group – previously considered an order – of extinct placental mammals, known primarily from the Paleocene and Eocene epochs. They are considered early, primitive ungulates. It is now largely considered to be a wastebasket taxon, having served as a dumping ground for classifying ungulates which had not been clearly established as part of either Perissodactyla or Artiodactyla, being composed thus of several unrelated lineages.

Taxonomic history 
Condylarthra always was a problematic group. , however, raised Condylarthra to an order and included a wide range of diverse placentals with generalized dentitions and postcranial skeletons. More recent researchers (i.e. post-WW2) have been more restrictive; either including only a limited number of taxa, or proposing that the term should be abandoned altogether. Due to their primitive characteristics condylarths have been considered ancestral to several ungulate orders, including the living Artiodactyla, Cetacea, Perissodactyla, Hyracoidea, Sirenia, and Proboscidea, as well as the extinct Desmostylia, Embrithopoda, Litopterna, Notoungulata, and Astrapotheria.

 delimited condylarths as those having the following characters, but lacking the specializations present in more derived orders:
 superior ramus of stapedial artery shifted to petrosal or lost
 mastoid foramen lost
 bulla if present composed of ectotympanic
 relatively bunodont teeth with low cusp relief
 trigonids of lower molars shortened anteroposteriorly
 large, posteriorly projecting hypoconulid on M3 (lower third molar)
 head of astragalus is short and robust

Evolutionary history 

The disappearance of the dinosaurs opened up an ecological niche for large mammalian herbivores. Some condylarths evolved to fill the niche, while others remained insectivorous. This may explain, in part, the tremendous evolutionary radiation of the condylarths that we can observe throughout the Paleocene, resulting in the different groups of ungulates (or "hoofed mammals") that form the dominant herbivores in most Cenozoic animal communities on land, except on the island continent of Australia.

Among recent mammals, Paenungulata (hyraxes, elephants, and sea cows), Perissodactyla (horses, rhinoceroses, and tapirs), Artiodactyla (pigs, deer, antelope, cows, camels, hippos, and their relatives), Cetacea (whales), and Tubulidentata (aardvarks) are traditionally regarded as members of the Ungulata. Besides these, several extinct animals also belong to this group, especially the endemic South American orders of ungulates, (Meridiungulata). Although many ungulates have hooves, this feature does not define the Ungulata. Indeed, some condylarths had small hooves on their feet, but the most primitive forms are clawed.

Recent molecular and DNA research has reorganised the picture of mammalian evolution. Paenungulates and tubulidentates are seen as afrotherians, and no longer seen as closely related to the laurasiatherian perissodactyls, artiodactyls, and cetaceans, implying that hooves were acquired independently (i.e. were analogous) by at least two different mammalian lineages, once in the Afrotheria and once in the Laurasiatheria. Condylarthra itself, therefore, is polyphyletic: the several condylarth groups are not closely related to each other at all. Indeed, Condylarthra is sometimes regarded as a 'wastebasket' taxon. True relationships remain in many cases unresolved.

In addition to meridiungulates and living ungulates, a condylarthran ancestry has been proposed for several other extinct groups of mammals, including Mesonychia and Dinocerata.

Taxonomy

Family Arctocyonidae (possibly polyphyletic assemblage)
Genus Arctocyon
Genus Chriacus
Family Periptychidae
Genus Ectoconus
Genus Oxyacodon
Family Hyopsodontidae (now established as within Perissodactyla)
Subfamily Tricuspiodontinae
Genus Litomylus
Genus Paratricuspiodon
Genus Tricuspiodon
Genus Aletodon
Genus Decoredon
Genus Dipavali
Genus Dorraletes
Genus Haplaletes
Genus Haplomylus
Genus Hyopsodus
Genus Louisina
Genus Microhyus
Genus Midiagnus
Genus Oxyprimus
Genus Palasiodon
Genus Paschatherium
Genus Utemylus
Genus Yuodon
Family Mioclaenidae
Family Phenacodontidae (established as stem-Perissodactyla)
Subfamily Meniscotheriinae
Genus Ectocion
Genus Meniscotherium
Genus Almogaver
Genus Copecion
Genus Eodesmatodon
Genus Phenacodus
Family Pleuraspidotheriidae
Genus Hilalia 
Genus Orthaspidotherium 
Genus Parabunodon 
Genus Pleuraspidotherium 
Family Didolodontidae (stem-Meridiungulata)
Family Sparnotheriodontidae? (Litopterna)
Genus Tingamarra? (non-descript therian mammal)
Genus Protungulatum (either non-placental eutherian or basal artiodactyl).
Genus Kharmerungulatum (a zhelestid)

See also 
 Evolution of mammals
 List of prehistoric mammals

Notes

References

External links

Obsolete mammal taxa